Russell Bernard Jackson is an American upright and electric bass player.

Jackson was born in Memphis, Tennessee. He started his career as a bass player with Otis Clay in Chicago.

He then landed a job with B. B. King.  He toured internationally with King and his orchestra for six and a half years.

Jackson then attended the Dick Grove School of Music in Los Angeles.

During the course of his career Jackson played with many bands, including percussion project Silent Partners, and musicians Buddy Guy, Matt "Guitar" Murphy, Willie Nelson, Kenny Wayne, Marshall Lawrence Sunny Fournier. For a number of years Jackson fronted the Russell Jackson Band, based in Vancouver, British Columbia.  He also toured extensively with James "Buddy" Rogers.

References

Further reading
 Big City Blues Magazine, Volume 5 Detroit Blues Magazine, 1999
 The Rolling Stone jazz & blues album guide John Swenson Random House, May 1, 1999

American bass guitarists
Year of birth missing (living people)
Living people